Western Norway Regional Health Authority is a state-owned regional health authority responsible for operating the hospitals in the counties of Rogaland and Vestland in Norway. Based in Stavanger the authority operates five health trusts that operate nine hospitals. It is led by chairman Oddvard Nilsen (Conservative) and CEO Herlof Nilssen.

Other central agencies include Helse Vest IKT that operates the information technology systems. Haukeland University Hospital cooperates with the University of Bergen to provide medical education in Bergen.

Subsidiaries
Stavanger Health Trust
Stavanger Hospital
Bergen Health Trust
Haukeland University Hospital
Voss Hospital
Sandviken Hospital
Fonna Health Trust
Haugesund Hospital
Odda Hospital
Stord Hospital
Valen Hospital
Førde Health Trust
Førde Hospital
Lærdal Hospital
Nordfjord Hospital
Western Norway Pharmaceutical Trust

Government agencies of Norway
Health trusts of Norway
Companies based in Stavanger
Norwegian companies established in 2002
Health care companies established in 2002